Ministry of Defence Stafford otherwise known as MOD Stafford or Beacon Barracks is a Ministry of Defence site in Stafford, in England.

History

Beacon Barracks was renamed from RAF Stafford in 2006, after the Royal Air Force moved out. In 2013, the British Government announced the redevelopment of the barracks, to allow 16 Signal Regiment and 1 Armoured Division Signal Regiment to move there, in 2015.

The barracks are referred to as 'Stafford Station' and forms part of Headquarters West Midlands.

Based units
The following notable units are based at MOD Stafford.

British Army 
Royal Corps of Signals

 1st Signal Brigade
 16th Signal Regiment
 207 (Jerboa) Signal Squadron
 230 (Malaya) Signal Squadron
 247 Gurkha Signal Squadron
 255 (Bahrain) Signal Squadron
 Support Squadron
 22nd Signal Regiment
 217 Signal Squadron
 222 Signal Squadron
 248 (Gurkha) Signal Squadron
 Support Squadron

Defence Electronics and Components Agency 
 Defence Electronics and Components Agency Stafford

Royal Air Force 
Joint Helicopter Command

 Tactical Supply Wing

No. 22 Group (Training) RAF

 Royal Air Force Air Cadets
 Staffordshire Wing Headquarters
 No. 395 (Stafford) Squadron ATC

References

Stafford
Installations of the British Army
Barracks in England